Gelaysor is an abandoned town in the Ararat Province of Armenia.

See also
 Ararat Province

References 

Populated places in Ararat Province
Former populated places in the Caucasus